John Duff (1895–1958) was a Canadian race car driver.

John Duff may also refer to:

 John Duff (counterfeiter) (1759–1799), American counterfeiter, hunter, and scout
 John Duff (UP), president of Union Pacific Railroad (1873–1874)
 John B. Duff (born 1931), former commissioner of The Chicago Public Library
 John Finlay Duff (1799–1868), captain of ship Africaine and businessman in South Australia
 John Wight Duff (1866–1944), Scottish classicist and academic